Robotech 3000 was Harmony Gold's attempt to revive the Robotech franchise before the turn of the millennium. After the relative success of Voltron: The Third Dimension and Roughnecks: Starship Troopers Chronicles, a new Robotech sequel was proposed that would use 3D CG visuals, with producer Jason Netter and writer Carl Macek at the helm.

Story and development
The story was based during an era of peace under an interplanetary federation a thousand years in the future, to avoid conflicts with Robotech'''s complex continuity.

Some of the new concepts presented were Veritech Excavators, Proteus-group starships, but none of the trademark anime-look and transformable mecha of the earlier series were seen. The response to the Robotech 3000 promotional trailer at the 2000 FanimeCon anime convention was disastrous. Much of the negative feedback concerned the distinctive artistic style of the original anime series were going to be replaced by generic CGI characters in a style that resembled ReBoot. By the 2000 San Diego Comic-Con, it was revealed that the CG project had been cancelled, not only due to negative feedback from fans but also because American animation studio Netter Digital, which had been hired to produce the project, had gone bankrupt earlier that year.

An attempt was made to salvage the series as an anime-style production at Tatsunoko Productions (the studio that animated the original three unrelated TV series that were edited together by Carl Macek to create Robotech) and some pre-production art was produced, but this too was cancelled as a new regime of staffers joined Harmony Gold to once again reboot the Robotech franchise and begin development on Robotech: The Shadow Chronicles.

Home video
The Robotech 3000 trailer was released as part of a collector's edition DVD of Robotech: The Shadow Chronicles'' on November 20, 2007.

References

External links

 Universe 3000 - Archived home for Robotech 3000 fandom.
Robotech 3000 Trailer - The CG trailer seen at Comic-Con.
Robotech.com FAQ - The official "line" about abandoned projects such as the Sentinels and RT3000.

Robotech
Unaired television shows

ja:ロボテック#Robotech 3000